Mount Tom State Reservation encompasses the Mount Tom Range and is located in the Connecticut River Valley region of Massachusetts, just north of the city of Springfield. The reservation is noted for its biologic diversity, high cliffs, and rugged scenery.

Activities and amenities
Recreational activities include hiking, picnicking, canoeing, fishing, cross-country skiing, snowshoeing, and ice skating. The  Metacomet-Monadnock Trail passes through the reservation as do several low-profile seasonal auto roads. The reservation is also a popular place to observe seasonal raptor migrations.

References

External links
Mount Tom State Reservation Department of Conservation and Recreation
Mount Tom State Reservation Trail Map Department of Conservation and Recreation

State parks of Massachusetts
State Reservation
Raptor migration sites
Parks in Hampden County, Massachusetts
Holyoke, Massachusetts